Unseeded Ivo Karlović defeated Mariano Zabaleta 6–4, 6–1, to win the 2007 U.S. Men's Clay Court Championships singles event.
 Andy Murray entered ATP Top 10 for the first time due to Tommy Haas failing to defend his previous year points.

Seeds

Draws

Key
Q – Qualifier
WC – Wildcard
LL – Lucky loser
W/O – Walkover

Finals

Section 1

Section 2

External links
 Singles draw
 Singles qualifying draw

Singles

nl:ATP-toernooi van Houston 2007